Christian Flindt Bjerg (born 19 February 1974) is a Danish professional football manager and former player. He is currently the manager of Danish 2nd Division club Skive IK.

Early life
Flindt Bjerg was born in 1974 in Innsbruck, Austria, when his father, the Danish international Ove Flindt Bjerg, played for FC Wacker Innsbruck.

Playing career
Flindt Bjerg began his senior career in 1991 for AaB. Several club abroad followed. At German club Karlsruher SC he played for the reserve team in the Oberliga, and only made one first-team appearance in the Bundesliga during his three years at the club: on the 25th matchday of the 1994–95 season in a 1–1 draw against Eintracht Frankfurt, where he came on as a substitute in the 63rd minute for Thorsten Fink. Other clubs in Flindt Bjerg's career were Lugano, Tirol Innsbruck and the Norwegian clubs Viking and Odd Grenland. With Odd Grenland, he won the Norwegian Football Cup in 2000. Flindt Bjerg scored the winning goal in extra time to make it 2–1 against his former club Viking. In 2005, he returned to Denmark, where he played for Viborg, Jetsmark and Thisted.

Managerial career
After finishing his playing career in Thisted in 2011, Flindt Bjerg coached the local under-19 team there. In 2014, he was appointed head coach of the senior team competing in the third-tier 2nd Division West. In April 2015, it was announced that Flindt Bjerg had been appointed coach of the under-19 team of AGF. 

After two years in the youth department of the club from Aarhus, Flindt Bjerg was hired as the new head coach of recently relegated fourth-tier Denmark Series club Vejgaard BK from Aalborg. During three years at the club, he both led the club back to the 2nd Division and experienced a relegation. 

On 31 July 2020, Flindt Bjerg was appointed as the assistant to head coach Martin Thomsen at Skive IK, while tending to his job as a scout for German club Borussia Mönchengladbach. After Thomsen left Skive for a manager job at Hobro IK, Flindt Bjerg was appointed head coach of Skive on 21 June 2021. On 10 June 2022 it was confirmed, that Flindt Bjerg's contract had been terminated by mutual consent.

Honours

Player
Odd Grenland
Norwegian Football Cup: 2000

Manager
Vejgaard
Denmark Series: 2017–18

References

1974 births
Living people
Danish men's footballers
Danish expatriate men's footballers
Association football midfielders
AaB Fodbold players
Odds BK players
Viborg FF players
Viking FK players
Thisted FC players
FC Tirol Innsbruck players
FC Lugano players
Karlsruher SC players
Karlsruher SC II players
Jammerbugt FC players
Bundesliga players
Eliteserien players
Expatriate footballers in Norway
Expatriate footballers in Switzerland
Expatriate footballers in Austria
Expatriate footballers in Germany
Danish expatriate sportspeople in Norway
Danish expatriate sportspeople in Switzerland
Danish expatriate sportspeople in Austria
Danish expatriate sportspeople in Germany
Borussia Mönchengladbach non-playing staff
Danish football managers
Skive IK managers
Sportspeople from Innsbruck
Footballers from Tyrol (state)